The 2004 NBA All-Star Game was an exhibition basketball game which was played on February 15, 2004, at the Staples Center in Los Angeles, home of the Lakers and Clippers. This game was the 53rd edition of the North American National Basketball Association (NBA) All-Star Game and was played during the 2003–04 NBA season.

The West defeated the East 136–132, with Shaquille O'Neal of the Los Angeles Lakers winning the Most Valuable Player for the second time in his career. O'Neal scored 24 points and grabbed 11 rebounds. Jamaal Magloire led the East with 19 points and 8 rebounds.

All-Star Game

Coaches

The coach for the Western Conference team was Minnesota Timberwolves head coach Flip Saunders. The Timberwolves had a 37–15 record on February 15. The coach for the Eastern Conference team was Indiana Pacers head coach Rick Carlisle. The Pacers had a 39–14 record on February 15.

Players

The rosters for the All-Star Game were chosen in two ways. The starters were chosen via a fan ballot. Two guards, two forwards and one center who received the highest vote were named the All-Star starters. The reserves were chosen by votes among the NBA head coaches in their respective conferences. The coaches were not permitted to vote for their own players. The reserves consist of two guards, two forwards, one center and two players regardless of position. If a player is unable to participate due to injury, the commissioner will select a replacement.

For the fourth time in the last five years, Vince Carter of the Toronto Raptors led the ballots with 2,127,183 votes, which earned him a starting position in the Eastern Conference team for the fifth year in a row. Allen Iverson, Tracy McGrady, Jermaine O'Neal, and Ben Wallace completed the Eastern Conference starting position, which would've been the same starting line-up as the previous year, if Carter hadn't given his spot to Michael Jordan. The Eastern Conference reserves included four first-time selections, Kenyon Martin, Jamaal Magloire, Ron Artest, and Michael Redd. Jason Kidd, Paul Pierce, and Baron Davis rounded out the team. Three teams, Indiana Pacers and New Jersey Nets, and Charlotte Hornets had two representations at the All-Star Game with O'Neal/Artest, Martin/Kidd, and Magloire/Davis.

The Western leading vote-getter was Kevin Garnett, who earned his seventh consecutive All-Star Game selection with 1,780,918 votes. Steve Francis, Kobe Bryant, Yao Ming, and Tim Duncan completed the Western Conference starting positions, making it also the same starting line-up as the previous year. The Western Conference reserves included two first-time selections, Sam Cassell of the Minnesota Timberwolves, and Andrei Kirilenko of the Utah Jazz. The team is rounded out by Ray Allen, Brad Miller, Dirk Nowitzki, Peja Stojaković, and Shaquille O'Neal. Four teams, Los Angeles Lakers, Minnesota Timberwolves, Houston Rockets, and Sacramento Kings, had two representations at the All-Star Game with Bryant/O'Neal, Garnett/Cassell, Francis/Yao, and Stojaković/Miller.

Roster

- Here are the vote numbers;
http://www.nba.com/allstar2004/allstar_game/starter_040129.html

All-Star Weekend

Slam Dunk Contest

Three-Point Contest

Rookie Challenge

Rookie Roster:

Head Coach: Doug Collins
Assistant Coach: A.C. Green

Sophomore Roster:

Head Coach: Michael Cooper
Assistant Coach: Kareem Abdul-Jabbar

Said to be the most exciting Rookie Challenge in history due to all the highlight-reel dunks. Much of the hype centered on rookie phenoms LeBron James and Carmelo Anthony, who had 33 and 17 points respectively. Amar'e Stoudemire set a Rookie Challenge record with 36 points (it has since been broken).

External links
2004 NBA All-Star Game Website

National Basketball Association All-Star Game
All-Star
Basketball competitions in Los Angeles
NBA All-Star
2004 in Los Angeles